The 2010 Wayne State Warriors football team represented Wayne State University in the 2010 NCAA Division II football season. The Warriors offense scored 347 points while the defense allowed 228 points.

Schedule

References

Wayne State
Wayne State Warriors football seasons
Wayne State Warriors football